Hakea purpurea  is a  flowering plant in the family Proteaceae shrub and grows in Queensland and  New South Wales. It is a small shrub with needle-shaped leaves and clusters of red flowers in late winter to early spring.

Description
The branchlets are either smooth or with flattened, silky hairs. The leaves are thickly covered in short, matted, white or rusty coloured hairs quickly becoming smooth.

Taxonomy and naming
Hakea purpurea was first formally described by William Jackson Hooker in 1848 and published the description in Journal of an Expedition into the Interior of Tropical Australia. Derived from the Latin purpureus meaning 'purple' or 'dull red with a tinge of blue' a reference to the colour of the flowers.

Distribution and habitat
Hakea purpurea occurs in central Queensland  and has an isolated occurrence in hills north of Yetman in New South Wales. Grows in  open forest, woodland and heath, mostly in sandy soil.

Cultivation
A very showy species good for garden cultivation. Tolerant of fairly heavy frosts and attractive to nectar eating birds.

References

External links
 PlantNET New South Wales Flora Online:  Hakea purpurea 

purpurea
Flora of New South Wales
Flora of Queensland